Stade Municipal de Koulikoro is located in Koulikoro, Mali. It is used mostly for football and serves as the home stadium of AS Nianan.  The stadium has a capacity of 8,000 people.

Football venues in Mali
Koulikoro